"Chicago Freestyle" is a song by Canadian rapper Drake and American singer-songwriter Giveon. It was released as the third track from Drake's commercial mixtape Dark Lane Demo Tapes, on May 1, 2020. Drake interpolates Eminem's flow from his 2002 single "Superman" on the pre-chorus. When it was unofficially released on February 29, 2020, it was released concurrently with another song, "When to Say When".

Background
On February 29, 2020, Drake released "When To Say When" and "Chicago Freestyle" on SoundCloud. He also released a music video for both songs. The video stars Drake walking around New York City with scenes filmed in Marcy Projects in Brooklyn. The song is set to a "romantic" piano and a "hushed" chorus performed by Giveon. Lyrically, Drake "unpacks the run-of-the-mill anxieties and flexes" associated with his nightlife, while portraying "an underrated antagonist", as described by a Pitchfork article.

Critical reception
Grant Rindner of Complex felt that the lyrics reflected "Drake's first time being hurt in a long time", acknowledging "his heartbreak makes for great songs." Kevin Montes of Medium deemed the song "one of the original standouts with its subtle melancholy vibe to Drake's reflection of celebrity life in his verses." In a mixed review of both "Chicago Freestyle" and "When To Say When", Sheldon Pearce of Pitchfork felt Drake "doesn't play the heel nearly as well as '02 Em used to." NMEs Luke Morgan Britton found the song "cheesy."

Charts

Weekly charts

Year-end charts

Certifications

References

2020 songs
Drake (musician) songs
Giveon songs
Songs written by Drake (musician)
Songs written by Giveon
Songs written by Eminem
Songs written by Sevn Thomas
Songs written by Jeff Bass